Archbishop Antonio Lloren Mabutas † (13 June 1921 – 22 April 1999) was the first bishop of Diocese of Laoag and the second Archbishop of the Archdiocese of Davao. He succeeded Clovis Thibault, PME on 9 December 1972. He was also the President of the Catholic Bishops' Conference of the Philippines from 1981 to 1985.

Although he was considered a conservative within the Catholic Church heirarchy,
Mabutas is noted to be the first Roman Catholic Archbishop to write a pastoral letter to criticize human rights violations under the Marcos dictatorship.

Early years
Born in Agoo, La Union, he was ordained as priest on 6 April 1946 at the young age of 24. On 5 June 1961 he was appointed as bishop of Laoag and was ordained a month after.

Archbishop of Davao
Before becoming as Archbishop of Davao, the then Most Rev. Antonio Ll. Mabutas was appointed as coadjutor archbishop of Davao with Most Rev. Clovis Thibault, PME, JCL, DD as its first Archbishop during the time the Diocese of Davao was erected into an Archdiocese.  Before becoming the Archbishop of Davao he served as titular archbishop of Valeria on 25 July 1970. He succeeded as the archbishop of Davao on 9 December 1972.

The pastoral letter he wrote against Martial law, "Reign of Terror in the Countryside", citing human rights abuses and killings of church workers, is notable for having been the first pastoral to be written against Marcos' martial law administration.

Retirement and death
He retired as archbishop of Davao on 6 November 1996. He died at the age of 77 where he served as a priest for 53 years and a bishop for 37 years.

Legacy 
Some of Archbishop Mabutas' effects have been preserved, and are viewable to the public at the Museo de Iloko in his hometown of Agoo, La Union.

See also 
 Davao City
 Agoo, La Union
 Museo de Iloko
 Religious sector resistance against the Marcos dictatorship

References
Memoirs of Antonio Ll. Mabutas: Archbishop of Davao, a Tambara Publication, Ateneo de Davao University, 1996

External links

1921 births
1999 deaths
20th-century Roman Catholic archbishops in the Philippines
People from La Union
Roman Catholic archbishops of Davao
Presidents of the Catholic Bishops' Conference of the Philippines